Local elections were held in the Palestinian territories on 20 October 2012, with a second part to be held on 24 November 2012. A total of 245 village councils, 98 municipal councils and 10 local councils would be elected.

Background
Local elections had originally been scheduled for 17 July 2010. However, the Central Election Commission was unable to operate in the Hamas-controlled Gaza Strip, resulting in the Palestinian government announcing on 25 April that the elections would be postponed in the Strip. On 10 June 2010 the government announced that all local elections were cancelled.

As a result of the cancellation, several lawsuits were filed against the government. On 13 December the High Court ruled that cancelling the elections was illegal. The government subsequently announced that local elections would be held in 2011. They were originally scheduled for 9 July, before being postponed until 22 October due to the political split between the West Bank controlled by Fatah and the Gaza Strip controlled by Hamas. However, in August 2011, they were postponed indefinitely.

On 10 July 2012 the government announced that local elections would be held on 20 October.

Elections
Local elections were held in the West Bank on 20 October 2012, with a second part to be held on 24 November 2012. Fatah claimed victory after Hamas withdraw from elections.

voting took place in only 92 of the West Bank's 353 municipalities. More than 80 villages were unable to produce candidate lists(a symptom, Hamas claims, of Fatah intimidation). In a further 181 districts, only one candidate list was registered rendering polling unnecessary. With 54.8 per cent of those eligible to vote turned out to cast their ballot

Ms Nour Odeh, a spokesperson for the Palestinian Authority said "We are still hoping that elections will be held in Gaza. A person's right to vote cannot be held hostage to any political faction,".

Hamas Government in Gaza has refused to recognise the election "as a legitimate expression of the Palestinian peoples' will." The Palestinian Centre for Human Rights also questioned the legitimacy of the polls, "in light of the limiting of public freedoms and continuing widespread violations of human rights by the PA."

Results

Jerusalem Governorate

Abu Dis

Biddu

Jenin Governorate

Ajjah

Al-Yamun

'Anin

Araqah

Arraba

Bir al-Basha

Burqin

Fandaqumiya

Jaba

Jenin

Qabatiya

Raba

Rummanah

Silat ad-Dhahr

Zababdeh

Tulkarm Governorate

Attil

Bal'a

Baqa ash-Sharqiyya

Beit Lid

Deir al-Ghusun

Tulkarm

Zeita

Elections by Acclamation

References

Elections in the Palestinian National Authority
2012 elections in Asia
2012 in the Palestinian territories
Elections in the State of Palestine
2013 elections in Asia
2013 in the State of Palestine
Local elections in Palestine